Francesco Marano (born 27 May 1990) is an Italian professional footballer who plays as a midfielder for  club A.C. Renate.

Club career
On 28 September 2020, he joined Renate.

References

External links
 
 

1990 births
Living people
People from Castellammare di Stabia
Footballers from Campania
Italian footballers
Association football midfielders
Serie C players
S.S. Juve Stabia players
Casertana F.C. players
Benevento Calcio players
U.S. Viterbese 1908 players
A.S. Melfi players
A.S.D. Sicula Leonzio players
Como 1907 players
A.C. Renate players